Lepidochrysops outeniqua, the Outeniqua blue, is a species of butterfly in the family Lycaenidae. It is endemic to South Africa, where it is found in fynbos on the Outeniqua Mountains in the Western Cape.

The wingspan is 32–36 mm for males and 34–38 mm for females. Adults are on wing from November to December. There is one generation per year.

References

Lepidochrysops
Butterflies described in 1983
Endemic butterflies of South Africa
Taxonomy articles created by Polbot